Parade is a Canadian music variety television series which aired on CBC Television from 1959 to 1964.

Premise
Parade was created as an open-format entertainment series which covered most music styles and included comedy performances. Sometimes an episode would focus on one particular performer, while another episode could feature various entertainers under a particular theme.

The series featured Canadian artists such as the Canadian Opera Company, Maynard Ferguson, Oscar Peterson, the Toronto Symphony Orchestra and the Billy Van Four. Featured international performers included Ernestine Anderson, Pete Seeger and Jonathan Winters. Wayne and Shuster provided their interpretation of James Thurber's Many Moons in a 1963 episode. The "Sing, Sing, Sing" episodes of Parade were recurring occasions which featured Pat Hervey and the Gino Silvi Singers leading a sing-along, supplemented by dance performances from a troupe choreographed by Alan Lund supported by an orchestra led by Bert Niosi.

Reception
In early 1962, Parade was ranked Canada's 17th most popular series according to national ratings by Elliott-Haynes.

Scheduling
This half-hour series was broadcast as follows (times in Eastern):

The episodes from July to September 1962 were rebroadcasts from the two previous seasons.

The series was cancelled after 1964 due to reported reductions in CBC's variety budget. Norman Sedawie, Parade's producer, then left CBC for work in America.

References

External links
 

CBC Television original programming
1959 Canadian television series debuts
1964 Canadian television series endings
1950s Canadian music television series
1960s Canadian music television series
1950s Canadian variety television series
1960s Canadian variety television series
Black-and-white Canadian television shows